Bavory is a municipality and village in Břeclav District in the South Moravian Region of the Czech Republic. It has about 400 inhabitants.

References

External links

 

Villages in Břeclav District